Kathryn Givney (October 27, 1896 – March 16, 1978) was an American actress on stage and in films.

Biography
In 1928, Givney was a member of the S. E. Cochran Repertory Company. In 1930, she appeared in Stepping Sisters at the Hollywood Playhouse.

She appeared in the films Follow Thru, Isn't It Romantic?, My Friend Irma, Side Street, Ma and Pa Kettle Go to Town, Operation Pacific, Valentino, A Place in the Sun, Lightning Strikes Twice, Double Crossbones, Little Egypt, Too Young to Kiss, The Kid from Left Field, Let's Do It Again, Three Coins in the Fountain, Daddy Long Legs, Count Three and Pray, Lady Godiva of Coventry, Guys and Dolls, Congo Crossing, The Wayward Bus, A Certain Smile, The Man in the Net, From the Terrace, That Touch of Mink, Four Horsemen of the Apocalypse and Once You Kiss a Stranger.

On Broadway, Givney appeared in This, Too, Shall Pass (1946), Good Night, Ladies (1945), Wallflower (1944), Tomorrow the World (1943), The Flowers of Virtue (1942), Little Dark Horse (1941), The Happiest Days (1939), One Thing After Another (1937), Fulton of Oak Falls (1937), If This Be Treason (1935), Lost Horizons (1934), Absent Father (1932), Peter Flies High (1931), The Behavior of Mrs. Crane (1928), Nightstick (1927), We All Do (1927), and Ballyhoo (1927).

Marriage
Givney was married to Francis Connolly.

Death
On March 16, 1978, Givney died at her home in Hollywood at age 81.

Filmography

References

External links
 
 

1896 births
1978 deaths
20th-century American actresses
American film actresses
American stage actresses
Actresses from Wisconsin